Cook Racing Technologies (formerly Cook-Finley Racing, and Chad Finley Racing) is an American professional stock car racing team that currently competes in the NASCAR Craftsman Truck Series, fielding the No. 84 Toyota Tundra part-time for Clay Greenfield and in the ARCA Menards Series, fielding the No. 42 Toyota Camry full-time for Robby Lyons. The team is owned by veteran crew chief Bruce Cook.

History
Driver Chad Finley formed a part-time team in the ARCA Racing Series in 2016, where he would be the driver. it was his first season in the series since 2010 when he drove part-time for K-Automotive Motorsports. In the team's debut race at Michigan, they fielded the No. 51 Chevrolet, where they would start and finish thirteenth. Their next start came at IRP, and Finley had a strong fifth-place finish. He attempted one more race that year at Chicagoland, where Finley qualified fourth but did not finish the race, ending up in 23rd.

The team returned in 2017, and in their first start of the season, which came at Nashville, Finley pulled off an upset win.

On June 20, 2018, it was announced that Chad Finley would enter the summer Gateway race fielding his self-owned No. 42 Chevrolet. He started 20th and came home with an impressive 6th place finish. Finley and the No. 42 returned at Bristol. Finley started 12th, but finished in a disappointing 30th place finish after an early exit due to an engine issue.

On December 5, 2018, it was announced that the No. 42 would run full-time in the 2019 season. Chad Finley, Robby Lyons, and other drivers were to split the ride throughout the season. The team qualified 20th in the season-opener at Daytona with Robby Lyons behind the wheel, but would fall victim to an accident on lap 2, effectively ending their night. After the 30th place finish at Daytona, Chad Finley took the reins at Atlanta, where he started 30th before being involved in another accident, leaving them with a 28th place result. After the conclusion of this event, the team's hauler entered the incorrect and shorter tunnel when exiting the track (on the way back to the shop), sustaining severe damage to both the hauler and the race trucks inside. This forced the team to withdraw from both the spring Las Vegas, and Martinsville races. CFR returned in Texas, with Garrett Smithley driving the No. 42 this time, making his first start with the team. Smithley rolled off from the 25th position, before driving up through the field to finish a solid 15th place. Finley then took the wheel, starting and finishing in the 18th position at Charlotte. At Kentucky, Finley qualified in the 12th spot and looked to have a good run going, before getting loose and backing into the turn 3 wall, effectively placing them in the 26th position.

On November 21, 2019, Finley announced the team's Truck Series assets had been sold to focus on racing in the American Ethanol Late Model Tour.

On January 30, 2020, it was announced that the team would be returning and debuting in the ARCA Menards Series East (formerly the NASCAR K&N Pro Series East), fielding the No. 42 Toyota part-time for Parker Retzlaff starting at Five Flags. With Finley focusing on running late models, the team's crew chief, Bruce Cook, took over most of the ownership of the stock-car team, and it was renamed Cook-Finley Racing. Cook and Retzlaff worked together at Visconti Motorsports in 2019 in two races. (Cook crew chiefed for both teams that year.) In addition, it was announced that the CFR team would have a partnership with Visconti this season.

NASCAR

Truck No. 42 history
In 2018, Chad Finley attempted this car for Gateway and Bristol, with a top-10 finish.

In 2019, Robby Lyons drove for Finley at Daytona, Finley himself driving for 4 races, and Garrett Smithley running at Texas for his Triple Duty.

Truck No. 42 results

Truck No. 84 history
In 2022, Clay Greenfield attempted this car at Daytona, but failed to do so. Greenfield then tried Nashville but did not qualify as well. Greenfield did manage to qualify at Talladega, where he finished 12th.

Truck No. 84 results

ARCA Menards Series

Car No. 41 history
In 2020, Kyle Sieg attempted this car part-time.

Car No. 41 results

Car No. 42 history
In 2020, Kyle Sieg attempted this car at Lucas Oil Raceway, later on Parker Retzlaff would attempt the two East Combination races.

In 2021, Conner Jones would make his debut at Iowa, Tyler Ankrum in at the Glen, and Parker Retzlaff returning for Milwaukee.

In 2022, Christian Rose would race part-time in the No. 42.

Car No. 42 results

Car No. 51 history
In 2016, Chad Finley attempted this car part-time, and would do so for two more years.

Car No. 51 results

References

External links
 

NASCAR teams
2016 establishments in the United States